Aleksandr Vorobey (born 5 May 1957) is a Soviet middle-distance runner. He competed in the men's 3000 metres steeplechase at the 1980 Summer Olympics.

References

1957 births
Living people
Athletes (track and field) at the 1980 Summer Olympics
Soviet male middle-distance runners
Soviet male steeplechase runners
Olympic athletes of the Soviet Union
Place of birth missing (living people)